L. Rødne og Sønner AS is a passenger ferry operating company in Rogaland and Vestland, Norway. It operates 14 ferries, of which 11 are fast ferries. The company operates public transport for the transport authorities Kolumbus and Skyss, boat ambulance services for Stavanger Hospital Trust, Fonna Hospital Trust and Bergen Hospital Trust, and since 1974 charter tourist services in Lysefjord. The company was founded in 1956, based in Sjernarøy and owned by ten members of the Rødne family.

References

External links
 Official site

Ambulance services in Norway
Companies based in Rogaland
Ferry companies of Rogaland
Ferry companies of Vestland
Transport companies established in 1956
1956 establishments in Norway